Nefastus Dies is a black/death metal band from Montreal, Quebec, Canada.

History

The band formed in 2002 and completed it's final lineup in 2005. Two months later, released their promo cd 'Prelude'. They then embarked on a promotional tour to support the recording in January 2006. In March 2006 they entered Yannick St-Amand's studio to record their first full-length album. They then signed with an underground label but quickly realised that this label did not have the proper resources to promote this album. .

In 2008, they released their first and only album Urban Cancer. Allmusic rated it 2.5 stars.

In early 2009 the band released a 2-song Promo EP entitled `Interlude` exclusively over the internet. Shortly after this, singer and main composer Seb Painchaud decided to leave the band.

Band members

Current members
Fred Desmeules − guitar (2003−present)
Frank lebeau − guitar (2003−present)
Tim Sanders − bass guitar (2008−present)
Max Ducharme − drums (2005 − present)

Former members
Christian Gauthier - vocals, guitar (2000-2007)
Seb Painchaud − vocals (2005−2009)
Guillaume Audet − keyboards (2003−2007)
Tommy Mckinnon − drums (2003−2005)

Discography

Studio albums
Urban Cancer (2008)

Miscellaneous
Prelude (2005, promo)
Interlude (2009, promo)

External links
Official MySpace
Current Label
Hate Vector Video

References

Musical groups established in 2005
Canadian black metal musical groups
Canadian death metal musical groups
Musical groups from Montreal
Musical quintets
2005 establishments in Quebec